The Third Division Football Tournament for the 2011 season in the Maldives started on October 17, 2011.

Tournament format
The 41 teams first play a knockout phase. The top 8 teams in the first round advance to the second round. The 8 teams are divided into 2 groups of 4 teams in each group. The top 2 teams from each group play in the semi-final. The winner of both groups compete in the first semi. Winner of first semi is in the final, while the loser plays in the third semi. The second semi is played between the runners-up of both groups. The winner of second semi faces the loser of the first semi in the third semi, while the loser of second semi is eliminated from the tournament. The third semi is played between the loser of the first semi and the winner of the second semi. The winner of the third semi is the second team to play in the final of the tournament.

Final

Awards
All the awards were given by the Maldives national football team coach István Urbányi.

External links
 Third Division first match to UN Friends at Haveeru Online (Dhivehi)
 PK beats Rivalsa at Haveeru Online (Dhivehi)
 Zefrol to final at Haveeru Online (Dhivehi)
 UN Friends wins first match at Haveeru Online (Dhivehi)

References

Maldivian Third Division Football Tournament seasons
3